Cyanobacterial morphology refers to the form or shape of cyanobacteria. Cyanobacteria are a large and diverse phylum of bacteria defined by their unique combination of pigments and their ability to perform oxygenic photosynthesis.

Cyanobacteria often live in colonial aggregates that can take a multitude of forms. Of particular interest among the many species of cyanobacteria are those that live colonially in elongate hair-like structures, known as trichomes. These filamentous species can contain hundreds to thousands of cells. They often dominate the upper layers of microbial mats found in extreme environments such as hot springs, hypersaline water, deserts and polar regions, as well as being widely distributed in more mundane environments.

Many filamentous species are also motile, gliding along their long axis, and displaying photomovement by which a trichome modulates its gliding according to the incident light. The latter has been found to play an important role in guiding the trichomes to optimal lighting conditions, which can either inhibit the cells if the incident light is too weak, or damage the cells if too strong.

Diversity of forms
Cyanobacteria present remarkable variability in terms of morphology: from unicellular and colonial to multicellular filamentous forms. Their cell size varies from less than 1 µm in diameter (picocyanobacteria) up to 100 µm (some tropical forms in the genus Oscillatoria)

Filamentous forms exhibit functional cell differentiation such as heterocysts (for nitrogen fixation), akinetes (resting stage cells), and hormogonia (reproductive, motile filaments). These, together with the intercellular connections they possess, are considered the first signs of multicellularity.

Many cyanobacteria form motile filaments of cells, called hormogonia, that travel away from the main biomass to bud and form new colonies elsewhere. The cells in a hormogonium are often thinner than in the vegetative state, and the cells on either end of the motile chain may be tapered. To break away from the parent colony, a hormogonium often must tear apart a weaker cell in a filament, called a necridium.

Colonial and unicellular
In aquatic habitats, unicellular cyanobacteria are considered as an important group regarding abundance, diversity, and ecological character. Unicellular cyanobacteria have spherical, ovoid, or cylindrical cells that may aggregate into irregular or regular colonies bound together by the mucous matrix (mucilage) secreted during the growth of the colony. Based on the species, the number of cells in each colony may vary from two to several thousand.

Each individual cell (each single cyanobacterium) typically has a thick, gelatinous cell wall. They lack flagella, but hormogonia of some species can move about by gliding along surfaces.

Filamentous and multicellular

Some filamentous species can differentiate into several different cell types:
 vegetative cells – the normal, photosynthetic cells that are formed under favorable growing conditions
 akinetes – climate-resistant spores that may form when environmental conditions become harsh
 thick-walled heterocysts – which contain the enzyme nitrogenase vital for nitrogen fixation in an anaerobic environment due to its sensitivity to oxygen.

Many of the multicellular filamentous forms of Oscillatoria are capable of a waving motion; the filament oscillates back and forth. In water columns, some cyanobacteria float by forming gas vesicles, as in archaea. These vesicles are not organelles as such. They are not bounded by lipid membranes but by a protein sheath.

Branched

Heterocysts
Heterocysts are specialized nitrogen-fixing cells formed during nitrogen starvation by some filamentous cyanobacteria, such as Nostoc punctiforme, Cylindrospermum stagnale, and Anabaena sphaerica. They fix nitrogen from atmospheric N2 using the enzyme nitrogenase, in order to provide the cells in the filament with nitrogen for biosynthesis.

Movement

Cyanobacteria are ubiquitous, finding habitats in most water bodies and in extreme environments such as the polar regions, deserts, brine lakes and hot springs. They have also evolved surprisingly complex collective behaviours that lie at the boundary between single-celled and multicellular life. For example, filamentous cyanobacteria live in long chains of cells that bundle together into larger structures including biofilms, biomats and stromatolites. These large colonies provide a rigid, stable and long-term environment for their communities of bacteria. In addition, cyanobacteria-based biofilms can be used as bioreactors to produce a wide range of chemicals, including biofuels like biodiesel and ethanol. However, despite their importance to the history of life on Earth, and their commercial and environmental potentials, there remain basic questions of how filamentous cyanobacteria move, respond to their environment and self-organize into collective patterns and structures.

All known cyanobacteria lack flagella; however, many filamentous species move on surfaces by gliding, a form of locomotion where no physical appendages are seen to aid movement. The actual mechanism behind gliding is not fully understood, although over a century has elapsed since its discovery. One theory suggests that gliding motion in cyanobacteria is mediated by the continuous secretion of polysaccharides through pores on individual cells. Another theory suggests that gliding motion involves the use of type IV pili, polymeric assemblies of the protein pilin, as the driving engines of motion. However, it is not clear how the action of these pili would lead to motion, with some suggesting they retract, while others suggest they push, to generate forces. Other scholars have suggested surface waves generated by the contraction of a fibril layer as the mechanism behind gliding motion in Oscillatoria. Recent work also suggests that shape fluctuations and capillary forces could be involved in gliding motion.

Through collective interaction, filamentous cyanobacteria self-organize into colonies or biofilms, symbiotic communities found in a wide variety of ecological niches. Their larger-scale collective structures are characterized by diverse shapes including bundles, vortices and reticulate patterns. Similar patterns have been observed in fossil records. For filamentous cyanobacteria, the mechanics of the filaments is known to contribute to self-organization, for example in determining how one filament will bend when in contact with other filaments or obstacles. Further, biofilms and biomats show some remarkably conserved macro-mechanical properties, typically behaving as viscoelastic materials with a relaxation time of about 20 min.

Cyanobacteria have strict light requirements. Too little light can result in insufficient energy production, and in some species may cause the cells to resort to heterotrophic respiration. Too much light can inhibit the cells, decrease photosynthesis efficiency and cause damage by bleaching. UV radiation is especially deadly for cyanobacteria, with normal solar levels being significantly detrimental for these microorganisms in some cases.

Filamentous cyanobacteria that live in microbial mats often migrate vertically and horizontally within the mat in order to find an optimal niche that balances their light requirements for photosynthesis against their sensitivity to photodamage. For example, the filamentous cyanobacteria Oscillatoria sp. and Spirulina subsalsa found in the hypersaline benthic mats of Guerrero Negro, Mexico migrate downwards into the lower layers during the day in order to escape the intense sunlight and then rise to the surface at dusk. In contrast, the population of Microcoleus chthonoplastes found in hypersaline mats at Salin-de-Giraud, Camargue, France migrate to the upper layer of the mat during the day and are spread homogenously through the mat at night. An in vitro experiment using P. uncinatum also demonstrated this species' tendency to migrate in order to avoid damaging radiation. These migrations are usually the result of some sort of photomovement, although other forms of taxis can also play a role.

Many species of cyanobacteria are capable of gliding. Gliding is a form of cell movement that differs from crawling or swimming in that it does not rely on any obvious external organ or change in cell shape and it occurs only in the presence of a substrate. Gliding in filamentous cyanobacteria appears to be powered by a "slime jet" mechanism, in which the cells extrude a gel that expands quickly as it hydrates providing a propulsion force, although some unicellular cyanobacteria use type IV pili for gliding. Individual cells in a trichome have two sets of pores for extruding slime. Each set is organized in a ring at the cell septae and extrudes slime at an acute angle. The sets extrude slime in opposite directions and so only one set is likely to be activated during gliding. An alternative hypothesis is that the cells use contractive elements that produce undulations running over the surface inside the slime tube like an earthworm. The trichomes rotate in a spiral fashion, the angle of which corresponds with the
pitch angle of Castenholz's contractile trichomes.

The cells appear to coordinate their gliding direction by an electrical potential that establishes polarity in the trichomes, and thus establishes a "head" and the "tail". Trichomes usually reverse their polarity randomly with an average period on the order of minutes to hours. Many species also form a semi-rigid sheath that is left behind as a hollow tube as the trichome moves forward. When the trichome reverses direction, it can move back into the sheath or break out.

Oscillatoria is a genus of filamentous cyanobacterium named after the oscillation in its movement. Filaments in colonies slide back and forth against each other until the whole mass is reoriented to its light source. Oscillatoria is mainly blue-green or brown-green and is commonly found in watering-troughs. It reproduces by fragmentation forming long filaments of cells which can break into fragments called hormogonia. The hormogonia can then grow into new, longer filaments.

Häder's cyanograph experiment

In 1987, Häder demonstrated that trichomes can position themselves quite precisely within their environment through photomovement. In Häder's cyanograph experiment a photographic negative is projected onto a Petri dish containing a culture of Phormidium uncinatum. After a few hours, the trichomes move away from the darker areas onto the lighter areas, forming a photographic positive on the culture. The experiment demonstrates that photomovement is effective not just for discrete light traps, but for minutely patterned, continuously differentiated light fields as well.

See also
 Bacterial cellular morphologies
 Colonial morphology

References

Cyanobacteria